Bagassa guianensis is a tree in the plant family Moraceae which is native to the Guianas and Brazil.  It is valued as a timber tree and as a food tree for wildlife.  The juvenile leaves are distinctly different in appearance from the mature leaves, and were once thought to belong to different species.

Description
The leaves are deeply three-lobed in juveniles, but become entire as the tree matures.

Male and female flowers are borne on separate inflorescences.

Taxonomy
Bagassa is a monotypic genus—it includes only one species, B. guianensis. The genus was established in 1775 by French botanist Jean Baptiste Christophore Fusée Aublet in his description of the species. Aublet's description was based on juvenile leaves together with infructescences. Based on mature leaves and male inflorescences, French botanist Nicaise Auguste Desvaux described Piper tiliifolium in 1825 and Charles Gaudichaud-Beaupré described Laurea tiliifolia in 1844. Raymond Benoist transferred these to Bagassa as B. tiliifolia in 1933. In 1880 Louis Édouard Bureau described B. sagotiana based on mature leaves and female inflorescences. Plants with juvenile and adult foliage were thought to belong to different species until at least 1975; in his 1975 treatment of the Moraceae for the Flora of Suriname, Dutch systematist Cornelis Berg maintained B. guianensis and B. tiliifolia as separate species—the former with lobed juvenile foliage, the latter with the entire leaves of mature trees (although he maintained this distinction with reservations). This confusion would later be clarified through observations of live trees in the field.

Common names
The species is known locally as "cow wood", katowar, tuwue or yawahedan in Guyana.  In Suriname is it known as gele bagasse, jawahedan, kauhoedoe or kaw-oedoe.  In French Guiana it is called bacasse, bagasse, odon or odoun.  In Maranhão state in Brazil it is called tatajuba or tareka'y; in Pará it is known as amaparana, taraiko'i or tatajuba; in Roraima it is called tatajuba.

Distribution
Bagassa guianensis is found in Guyana, Suriname, French Guiana and the northern Amazon basin (in the states of Amapá, Pará, Maranhão and Roraima) with an apparently disjunct population in the southwestern states of Mato Grosso and Rondônia.

Ecology
Bagassa guianensis is a "long-lived pioneer" that frequently established in second growth forests and tree-fall gaps.

Although the structure of B. guianensis flowers suggests bat-pollination, Berg suggested that they might be wind-pollinated since the trees were "tall and deciduous". Direct observation suggests that pollination is primarily by thrips, although the thrips themselves may be dispersed by wind.

The seeds of B. guianensis are dispersed by a variety of animals including monkeys, birds, deer, rodents and tortoises.

Uses
Bagassa guianensis is a valuable timber species and is intensively exploited.  It is used for construction, furniture, and boat-building.

The infructescences are edible.

References

Moraceae
Monotypic Rosales genera
Trees of Brazil
Trees of French Guiana
Trees of Guyana
Trees of Suriname
Moraceae genera
Taxa named by Jean Baptiste Christian Fusée-Aublet
Dioecious plants